The Magic School Bus Rides Again is an animated children's web series, based on the book series of the same name by Joanna Cole and Bruce Degen. It also serves as a continuation of the 1994–97 PBS Kids series The Magic School Bus, with Lily Tomlin reprising her role as Ms. Frizzle. The series premiered on Netflix on September 29, 2017. The second season premiered on April 13, 2018.

Three 45-minute specials, "Kids in Space", "The Frizz Connection", and "In the Zone", premiered on Netflix in 2020. They were dedicated to Joanna Cole, the author of the original books, who died that year.

Plot
In the sequel to Scholastic's The Magic School Bus, the flagship Dr. Valerie Frizzle (now Professor Frizzle) gets her Ph.D and retires from teaching at Walkerville Elementary School. She then hires her younger sister, Miss Fiona Frizzle, to teach the class, and passes the keys of the Magic School Bus over to her. The kids journey on exciting new field-trips, discovering new locations, creatures, time periods and more to learn about the wonders of science, educating viewers along the way, on the eponymous Bus.

Voice cast

 Kate McKinnon as Miss Fiona Felicity Frizzle
 Lily Tomlin as Professor Valerie Felicity Frizzle, Ph.D.
 Miles Koseleci-Vieira (Seasons 1-2) and Roman Lutterotti (specials) as Arnold Matthew Perlstein
 Lynsey Pham as Wanda Li
 Mikaela Blake as Keesha Franklin
 Gabby Clarke as Dorothy Ann Hudson
 Leke Maceda-Rustecki as Carlos Ramon
 Matthew Mintz (Seasons 1-2)  and Matthew Mucci (specials) as Ralphie Alessandro Giuseppe Tennelli
 Birva Pandya as Jyoti Kaur (new student after Phoebe Terese went back to her old school) 
 Kaden Stephen as Tim Wright

Guest stars

 Will Arnett as Galapagos Gil ("Frizzle of the Future")
 Mae Jemison as Keesha's favorite celebrity astronaut, Kathy K. Kuiper ("Space Mission: Selfie")
 Sandra Oh as Dr. Sarah Bellum ("Ralphie Strikes a Nerve")
 Jay Baruchel as Dr. Tillage ("Ghost Farm")
 Nathan Fillion as Dorothy Ann's famous scientist uncle, Dr. Axle "ValveStuck" ("Waste Not, Want Not")
 Catherine O'Hara as Aunt Tennelli and Teresina Tennelli, Ralphie's trapeze-artist aunt and cousin ("Ralphie and the Flying Tennellis")
 Martin Short as Tony Tennelli, also in Ralphie's family who works in the circus ("Ralphie and the Flying Tennellis")
 Lin-Manuel Miranda as Mathew Math Matthews ("Ralphie and the Flying Tennellis")
 Chris Hadfield as himself ("Kids in Space")
 Lights as Maven, Ms. Frizzle's pop-star cousin ("In the Zone")

Additional voices
 Lilly Bartlam
 Amos Crawley as Mr. Hudson, Dorothy Ann's father ("The Tales Glaciers Tell").
 Annelise Forbes as Arnold's cousin, Janet Perlstein
 Lisa Jai as Mrs. Li, Wanda's mother and as a caller in the Professor Frizzle segments ("The Magnetic Mambo", "The Tales Glaciers Tell", "The Land Before Tim", "Ghost Farm" and "Ralphie and the Flying Tennellis"). Jai was the voice of Wanda in the original series.
 Julie Lemieux
 Ana Sani as Pariksha Kaur, Jyoti's grandmother ("Nothin' but Net").
 Stuart Stone as the Gizmos That Go staff ("Three in One"), the Cosmic Corner Show announcer ("Space Mission: Selfie"), and a caller in the Professor Frizzle Segment ("Ghost Farm").
 Jamie Watson
 Marcus Craig as Mikey Ramon, Carlos' younger brother ("The Good, the Bad, and the Gnocchi").
 Martin Roach as Mr. Ruhle
 Kevin Vidal

Episodes

Season 1 (2017)

Season 2 (2018)

Specials (2020)

Production
In 2014, the series was first announced by Netflix and Scholastic Media, and was titled The Magic School Bus 360°. The new iteration of the franchise features a modernized "Ms. Frizzle" (replacing Valerie with her younger sister Fiona) and a high-tech bus that stresses modern inventions such as robotics, wearables and camera technology. The hope is to captivate children's imaginations and motivate their interest in the sciences. It was produced by 9 Story Media Group. Producer Stuart Stone, who voiced Ralphie in the original series, stated that The Magic School Bus 360° will feature some of the original voice actors in different roles. The show's voice cast is based in Los Angeles, California, United States and Toronto, Ontario, Canada with Susan Blu as the Los Angeles voice director and Alyson Court as the Toronto voice director. In February 2017, Kate McKinnon was cast in the role of Ms. Frizzle (without clarifying it was Fiona, the younger sister of Valerie, now Professor Frizzle, still voiced by Tomlin). The series then changed its name to The Magic School Bus Rides Again. The series was released on Netflix on September 29, 2017. The second season was released on April 13, 2018.

Lin-Manuel Miranda of Hamilton sings the theme song. Phoebe Terese, a character from the original series, is replaced by a new student named Jyoti, as it was revealed that Phoebe transferred back to her old school. The episode endings feature question and answer sessions with Professor Frizzle, echoing the segments about viewers calling the producer which accompanied the original series on commercial-free channels. Despite clarifying some creative license taken in the episode, these scenes are still set in a universe with magical vehicles. Among other changes, the students still wear the same clothes every day but they do not resemble those from the original series. Three 45–minute specials were released in 2020: the first special The Magic School Bus Rides Again: Kids in Space was released on August 7, the second named The Magic School Bus Rides Again: The Frizz Connection on October 20 and a third titled The Magic School Bus Rides Again: In the Zone on December 26. The artstyle was changed for the specials as the characters have no outlines and the lighting and shading are more detailed.

Critical reception

After the series' announcement and the release of its trailer, there was initial resistance to the new art style, absence of Lily Tomlin as Ms. Frizzle, and fear it would not live up to the original series. AOL accused the show of giving Ms. Frizzle a nose job. Bustle put this down to fans of the show being "protective of its legacy".

Despite this speculation, the series has been critically acclaimed upon release. Common Sense Media deemed the show a worthy successor to its 1990s sister series, praising its gender and ethnic diversity and its commitment to teaching children about STEM subjects.  Christianity Today argues that the show managed to keep the "genius of the franchise", which is that the children are almost more intrigued by the complexity and order of the natural world rather than the magic of the titular school bus. Daily Dot praised the series' premiere for addressing the change to the show's structure, putting viewers at ease through the transition, adding that the science was made "approachable". The Houstonian found the episodes' scenarios to be "pretty interesting", commenting on the academical and moral lessons. The AV Club felt the series lives up to its predecessor, and contains the same "goofy humor and ease with making learning fun". Another AV Club article wrote that the series is "lively, fast-paced, and exceedingly tolerable for adults", and full of enough science to allow them to park their kids in front of it guilt-free.

Some users on social media have accused the show of whitewashing the black characters.

Awards and nominations

|-
| 2018
| The Magic School Bus Rides Again
| Parent's Choice Silver Honor - Spring 2018 Television
| 
|-
| 2018
| The Magic School Bus Rides Again
| Common Sense "Great For Families" seal
| 
|-
| 2018
| Annellie Rose Samuel for episode "Space Mission: Selfie"
| Canadian Cinema Editors Award for Best Editing in Animation
|

References

External links
 The Magic School Bus Rides Again on Netflix
 

 
2010s American animated television series
2020s American animated television series
2010s American comic science fiction television series
2020s American comic science fiction television series
2017 American television series debuts
2020 American television series endings
2010s Canadian animated television series
2020s Canadian animated television series
2010s Canadian comic science fiction television series
2020s Canadian comic science fiction television series
2017 Canadian television series debuts
2020 Canadian television series endings
2017 web series debuts
2020 web series endings
2017 animated television series debuts
American children's animated adventure television series
American children's animated comic science fiction television series
American children's animated education television series
American children's animated science fantasy television series
Canadian children's animated adventure television series
Canadian children's animated comic science fiction television series
Canadian children's animated education television series
Canadian children's animated science fantasy television series
Animated television series about children
Animated television series reboots
American flash animated television series
Canadian flash animated television series
Buses in fiction
Science education television series
Netflix children's programming
Animated television series by Netflix
English-language Netflix original programming
American sequel television series
Television series by 9 Story Media Group
American television shows based on children's books
Canadian television shows based on children's books
Television series about educators